Ricinus vaderi is a species of chewing lice which parasitises the calandra lark (Melanocorypha calandra) in Azerbaijan. It is a member of Ricinus, the largest genus of chewing lice found parasitizing Passeriformes.

The species name is derived from Darth Vader, a fictional character in the Star Wars series. According to Miroslav Valan, Oldrich Sychra and Ivan Literak, the first author's fiancée noticed a similarity between the head of the R. vaderi and Darth Vader's helmet.

References

External links
 EntomologyToday (26 February 2016): New Chewing Lice Species Named after Darth Vader

Lice
Star Wars
Insects described in 2016
Fauna of Azerbaijan
Darth Vader